1986 Academy Awards may refer to:

 58th Academy Awards, the Academy Awards ceremony that took place in 1986
 59th Academy Awards, the 1987 ceremony honoring the best in film for 1986